Will Trent is an American police procedural crime drama television series based on Karin Slaughter's Will Trent series of novels. The series premiered on January 3, 2023, on ABC.

Premise 
Will Trent, having been abandoned by his parents as a child, has had to grow up in the Atlanta foster care system, which has had a lasting effect on him.  Despite being dyslexic, he has grown up to become a Special Agent in the Georgia Bureau of Investigation (GBI). Trent has an eye for observational detail, and this has enabled him to become the GBI agent with the highest case clearance rate.

This has engendered animosity in some of his peers, and also from Atlanta Police Department (APD) officerscomplicated by APD and GBI sharing an office buildingbecause Trent had been assigned a police corruption case and solving it resulted in the arrest of several APD officers. His boss at the GBI is Amanda Wagner, who assigns one of those disgruntled APD officers, Faith Mitchell, temporary GBI status as Trent's partner.

He is in an on-again off-again relationship with his childhood friend from the foster care system, APD Homicide Detective Angie Polaski, who works with Detective Michael Ormewood. The Trent and Polaski's cases sometimes overlap, bringing the two and their partners into ongoing contact.

Cast

Main
 Ramón Rodríguez as Will Trent
 Erika Christensen as Angie Polaski
 Iantha Richardson as Faith Mitchell 
 Jake McLaughlin as Michael Ormewood
 Sonja Sohn as Amanda Wagner

Guest
 Jennifer Morrison as Abigail Bentley Campano
 Mark-Paul Gosselaar as Paul Campano

Production

Development 
In February 2022, ABC ordered a pilot for 'Will Trent', based on Karin Slaughter's 'Will Trent' novel series, with Liz Heldens and Daniel Thomsen set to write and executive produce, and Slaughter to executive produce, with 20th Television as the studio. In August 2022, ABC ordered the series for 2022–23 mid-season. The series premiered on January 3, 2023, on ABC.

Casting 
Ramón Rodríguez was cast in the lead role in April 2022, with Erika Christensen cast as Angie Polaski.  In May 2022, Iantha Richardson was cast as Faith, Jake McLaughlin as Michael, and Sonja Sohn as Amanda.

Filming 
Production for the series started on October 10, 2022 and concluded on February 20, 2023.

Episodes

Reception

Critical response

The review aggregator website Rotten Tomatoes reported an 86% approval rating with an average rating of 6/10, based on 7 critic reviews. Metacritic, which uses a weighted average, assigned a score of 70 out of 100 based on 6 critics, indicating "generally favorable reviews".

Daniel Fienberg, of The Hollywood Reporter, wrote that it "quickly emerges as an above-average broadcast TV procedural". Max Gao, of The A.V. Club, gave the series a B−, stating that "It will welcome viewers who have never read the source material, but it risks alienating longtime fans of Slaughter's books."

Ratings

References

External links 
 Will Trent at ABC
 

English-language television shows
2023 American television series debuts
2020s American crime drama television series
2020s American mystery television series
2020s American police procedural television series
American Broadcasting Company original programming
Television series based on American novels
Television shows set in Atlanta
Television series by 20th Century Fox Television
Television series by 3 Arts Entertainment
Dyslexia in fiction